Arne Bystøl (born 6 May 1951) is a Norwegian Nordic combined skier. He was born in Vossestrand and represented the club IL Eldar. He competed at the 1976 Winter Olympics in Innsbruck, where he was placed 27th. He is the uncle of Lars Bystøl.

References

External links

1951 births
Living people
People from Voss
Norwegian male Nordic combined skiers
Olympic Nordic combined skiers of Norway
Nordic combined skiers at the 1976 Winter Olympics
Sportspeople from Vestland
20th-century Norwegian people